Vavanoor is a village in Pattambi taluk in Palakkad district of Kerala state, south India. The village is located near Koottanad, Pattambi.

The nearest railway station is in Pattambi, while the nearest airports are in Kozhikode, and Nedumbassery.

External links
Vavanoor Map

References

Villages in Palakkad district